Charterfeber is a Norwegian docu-soap that debuted in March 2006.

The show is about Norwegians traveling on a fully chartered vacation to southern Europe. 
The last time the program was sent on Norwegian television, TV3, was in December 2012. 
TV3 and the production company, Rakett Film & TV, have just released information about an upcoming season of the series.

Destinations
Season 1 (2006): Gran Canaria, Spain
Season 2 (2007): Crete, Greece
Season 3 (2008): Mallorca, Spain
Season 4 (2008 : Cyprus
Season 5 (2009): Tenerife, Spain
Season 6 (2010): Kos, Greece

TV3 (Norway) original programming
2006 Norwegian television series debuts